Battle of Damghan may refer to:
Battle of Damghan (1063)
Battle of Damghan (1447)
Battle of Damghan (1729)